Stefan Moody (born October 6, 1993) is an American professional basketball player for Chorale Roanne of the French LNB Pro A. Standing at 1.78 m (5'10"), he plays at the point guard position. After playing one year of college basketball at FAU, one year at Kilgore College and two years at Ole Miss, Moody entered the 2016 NBA draft, but he was not selected in the draft's two rounds.

High school
Moody attended and played high school basketball at Poinciana High School, in Osceola County, Florida, where he stayed until 2012 and led Poinciana High School to a 20-10 season. He was named to the Florida Class 7A all-state team and the Orlando Sentinel All-Central Florida team and to the Parade All-America team. As a senior, he averaged 27.9 points per game.

College career
After graduating from Poinciana High School, Moody played one year of college basketball for FAU. He was named to the All-Sun Belt Second Team, as a freshman. After the 2012–13 season, Moody transferred to Kilgore College. After one season, he transferred again to Ole Miss. He was named to the All-Southeastern Conference First Team, as a junior and as a senior.

Professional career
After going undrafted in the 2016 NBA draft, Moody joined Trabzonspor of the Turkish League. During his first pro season, Moody averaged 8.6 points and 4.1 assists per game.

On July 19, 2017, Moody joined Rethymno Cretan Kings of the Greek Basket League. On February 3, 2018, Moody scored 44 points against Koroivos, and he became the first player to score over 42 points in a Greek League game, in the last 12 years. 

Moody played for DEAC of the Hungarian league between 2019 and 2021. During the 2020-21 season, he averaged 14.7 points, 5.0 assists, 4.3 rebounds and 1.7 steals per game. 

On December 6, 2021, Moody signed with Larisa of the Greek Basket League. In 28 league games, he averaged 15.5 points (shooting with 39.4% from the 3-point line), 3 rebounds, 4.5 assists and 1.7 steals, playing around 32 minutes per contest. 

On July 4, 2022, Moody signed with French club Chorale Roanne.

The Basketball Tournament
Stefan Moody played for Armored Athlete in the 2018 edition of The Basketball Tournament. In 3 games, he averaged 8 points, 2 assists, and 1.7 rebounds per game. Armored Athlete reached the Super 16 before falling to Boeheim's Army.

References

External links
RealGM.com Profile 
ESPN Profile 
Eurobasket.com profile
Ole Miss College Bio

1993 births
Living people
American expatriate basketball people in Belarus
American expatriate basketball people in France
American expatriate basketball people in Greece
American expatriate basketball people in Hungary
American expatriate basketball people in South Korea
American expatriate basketball people in Turkey
American men's basketball players
Basketball players from Florida
BC Tsmoki-Minsk players
Chorale Roanne Basket players
Florida Atlantic Owls men's basketball players
Junior college men's basketball players in the United States
Kilgore College alumni
Larisa B.C. players
Ole Miss Rebels men's basketball players
Parade High School All-Americans (boys' basketball)
People from Kissimmee, Florida
Point guards
Rethymno B.C. players
Sportspeople from Greater Orlando
Suwon KT Sonicboom players
Trabzonspor B.K. players